C. S. Brown School Auditorium, also known as Brown Hall, is a historic school auditorium and national historic district located at Winton, Hertford County, North Carolina. It was built in 1926, and is a one-story stuccoed tile block building in the Colonial Revival style. It consists of a five-bay central pavilion with hip roof and flanking classroom wings.  The front facade features a pedimented portico with four original Doric order columns.  It is the oldest intact and unaltered building associated with the Calvin Scott Brown School, a school for African-American students founded by Calvin Scott Brown (1859–1936).

It was listed on the National Register of Historic Places in 1985.

References

African-American history of North Carolina
School buildings on the National Register of Historic Places in North Carolina
Colonial Revival architecture in North Carolina
School buildings completed in 1926
Buildings and structures in Hertford County, North Carolina
National Register of Historic Places in Hertford County, North Carolina
Historic districts on the National Register of Historic Places in North Carolina
1926 establishments in North Carolina